Ingo Spelly (born 6 November 1966 in Lübben, Brandenburg) is an East German-German sprint canoer who competed from the late 1980s to the early 1990s. Competing in two Summer Olympics, he won three medals with one gold (C-2 1000 m: 1992) and two silvers (C-2 500 m: 1992, C-2 1000 m: 1988).

Spelly also won seven medals at the ICF Canoe Sprint World Championships with two golds (C-2 1000 m: 1990, 1991), two silvers (C-2 500 m: 1990, C-4 1000 m: 1991), and three bronzes (C-2 500 m: 1986, C-2 1000 m: 1987, 1993).

References
DatabaseOlympics.com profile

1966 births
Living people
People from Lübben (Spreewald)
Canoeists at the 1988 Summer Olympics
Canoeists at the 1992 Summer Olympics
German male canoeists
Olympic canoeists of East Germany
Olympic canoeists of Germany
Olympic gold medalists for Germany
Olympic silver medalists for East Germany
Olympic silver medalists for Germany
Olympic medalists in canoeing
ICF Canoe Sprint World Championships medalists in Canadian
Medalists at the 1992 Summer Olympics
Medalists at the 1988 Summer Olympics
Sportspeople from Brandenburg